Tenn (stylized as TENN; 11 December 1978 – 25 September 2014) was a Japanese MC who was a member of the J-pop group ET-King. He was from Osaka Prefecture. His wife was Takako Uehara of Speed.

Biography
He was from Higashiōsaka, Osaka Prefecture. He graduated from St. Andrew's School. 
In 1999, he formed the band "ET-King" with Itokin and Klutch. Prior to their formation, he was a drummer in rock bands. He was a skilled rapper.

On 9 March 2012, he announced his engagement with Takako Uehara a member of the music group "Speed" and an actress . They later married on 23 August 2012.

He died on 25 September 2014 aged 35 soon after a suspected suicide attempt.

Discography
The list does not include his works with ET-King

Guest appearances

References

Japanese rappers
Suicides by hanging in Japan
Musicians from Osaka Prefecture
People from Higashiōsaka
1978 births
2014 suicides
2014 deaths